Guillermo Obeid (6 February 1941 – 2 December 1999) was an Argentine fencer. He competed in the individual and team épée events at the 1968 Summer Olympics.

References

1941 births
1999 deaths
Argentine male épée fencers
Olympic fencers of Argentina
Fencers at the 1968 Summer Olympics
Fencers from Buenos Aires
20th-century Argentine people